Two Worlds is a 1922 German silent film directed by Richard Löwenbein and starring Sascha Gura, Arnold Rieck, and Johanna Ewald.

The film's sets were designed by the art director Hans Sohnle.

Cast

References

External links

1922 films
Films of the Weimar Republic
German silent feature films
German black-and-white films
Films directed by Richard Löwenbein